Minus33 is an American company founded in New Hampshire by L.W Packard & Co. in 2001. 
Minus33 is claimed to have 100 years of textile manufacturing experience behind it in parent company L.W. Packard & Co. The company makes products primarily from superfine merino wool. Minus33 claims that this wool makes its products itch-free and resistant to shrinking. Minus33 also claims merino wool to have moisture wicking and antimicrobial properties, reducing odor. Reviews for Minus33 products are typically found in the context of equipment for hiking and other outdoor activities.  Minus33 was featured on New Hampshire TV station WMUR channel 9 in January 2015, highlighting L. W. Packard & Co. Inc.'s 100 years of manufacturing contributions to the success of the company. In 2001, the history of L. W. Packard and startup of Minus33 was part of an interview on New Hampshire Public Radio.

History
In 1840, the Briggs Brothers of Leeds, England built a woolen mill on the Squam River in the geographic center of New Hampshire. In the year 1916, Mr. Luther Packard of Berwick, Maine purchased the mill and named it L.W. Packard. In 1995, L.W. Packard was selected by Textile World magazine as one of the top ten textile plants in the world. In 2001, Minus33 was started by L.W. Packard.

References

External links
Minus33 official site

Outdoor clothing brands
Technical fabrics